The 2018 UCF Knights baseball team represents the University of Central Florida during the 2018 NCAA Division I baseball season. The Knights play their home games at John Euliano Park as a member of the American Athletic Conference. They are led by head coach Greg Lovelady, in his second season at UCF.

Previous season

Personnel

Roster

Coaching staff

Schedule

All rankings from Collegiate Baseball.

Rankings

Awards and honors

References

UCF Knights
UCF Knights baseball seasons
UCF Knights baseball